The Lake Macquarie Amateur was an amateur golf tournament in Australia. It was first played in 1958 and was organised by and played at the Belmont Golf Club in nearby Marks Point, New South Wales. It was a 72-hole stroke play tournament (54 holes in 1958).

It was a Golf Australia national ranking event and a "Category B" tournament in the World Amateur Golf Ranking.

Winners

2016 Harrison Endycott
2015 Corey Conners
2014 Ryan Evans
2013 Josh Munn
2012 Daniel Nisbet
2011 Brady Watt
2010 Kieran Pratt
2009 Scott Arnold
2008 Danny Lee
2007 Blake McGrory
2006 Adam Gee
2005 Marc Leishman
2004 Jarrod Lyle
2003 Jarrod Lyle
2002 Chris Campbell
2001 Nick Dougherty
2000 Scott Strange
1999 John Sutherland
1998 Brett Rumford
1997 Geoff Ogilvy
1996 Stephen Allan
1995 Lester Peterson
1994 Marcus Wheelhouse
1993 Steve Collins
1992 Stephen Leaney
1991 Shane Tait
1990 Ricky Willison
1989 Russell Claydon
1988 David Ecob
1987 Shane Robinson
1986 Peter O'Malley
1985 Ray Picker
1984 Jamie Crowe
1983 Colin Dalgleish
1982 Curt Byrum
1981 Roger Chapman
1980 Gerard Power
1979 Colin Kaye
1978 Ray Carlin
1977 Don Sharp
1976 Colin Kaye
1975 Colin Kaye
1974 Phil Billings
1973 Rodger Davis
1972 Bruce Boyle
1971 Don Sharp
1970 Don Sharp
1969 Jack Newton
1968 John Bennett
1967 Tony Jones
1966 Phil Billings
1965 Phil Billings
1964 Phil Billings
1963 Kevin Donohue
1962 Ken Johnston
1961 Phil Billings
1960 Phil Billings
1959 Phil Billings
1958 Bruce Devlin

Source:

References

External links
Belmont Golf Club

Amateur golf tournaments in Australia
Golf in New South Wales